Opeas hannense, common name the dwarf awlsnail, is a species of air-breathing land snail, a terrestrial pulmonate gastropod mollusk in the family Achatinidae.

Distribution 
Non-indigenous:
 Great Britain as a "hothouse alien".
 Canada

References

Further reading

External links 
 Photographs

Achatinidae
Gastropods described in 1831